The 64th Annual Primetime Creative Arts Emmy Awards ceremony was held on September 15 at the Nokia Theatre in Downtown Los Angeles and was televised September 22, 2012 on ReelzChannel. This is in conjunction with the annual Primetime Emmy Awards and is presented in recognition of technical and other similar achievements in American television programming.

Winners and nominees
Winners are listed first and highlighted in bold:

Governor's Award
 American Idol

Programs
{| class="wikitable"
|+ 
|-
| style="vertical-align:top;" width="50%" | 
 Undercover Boss (CBS) Antiques Roadshow (PBS)
 Jamie Oliver's Food Revolution (ABC)
 MythBusters (Discovery Channel)
 Shark Tank (ABC)
 Who Do You Think You Are? (NBC)
| style="vertical-align:top;" width="50%" | 
 The Kennedy Center Honors (CBS) Betty White's 90th Birthday: A Tribute to America's Golden Girl (NBC)
 Kathy Griffin: Tired Hooker (Bravo)
 Mel Brooks and Dick Cavett Together Again (HBO)
 Tony Bennett: Duets II (PBS)
|-
| style="vertical-align:top;" width="50%" | 
 Frozen Planet (Discovery Channel) American Masters (PBS)
 Anthony Bourdain: No Reservations (Travel Channel)
 Inside the Actors Studio (Bravo)
 The Weight of the Nation (HBO)
| style="vertical-align:top;" width="50%" | 
 George Harrison: Living in the Material World (HBO) 6 Days to Air: The Making of South Park (Comedy Central)
 Bobby Fischer Against the World (HBO)
 Gloria: In Her Own Words (HBO)
 Paul Simon's Graceland Journey: Under African Skies (A&E)
|-
| style="vertical-align:top;" width="50%" | 
 The Penguins of Madagascar (Episode: "The Return of the Revenge of Dr. Blowhole") (Nickelodeon) American Dad! (Episode: "Hot Water") (Fox)
 Bob's Burgers (Episode: "Burgerboss") (Fox)
 Futurama (Episode: "The Tip of the Zoidberg") (Comedy Central)
 The Simpsons (Episode: "Holidays of Future Passed") (Fox)
| style="vertical-align:top;" width="50%" | 
 Regular Show (Episode: "Eggscellent") (Cartoon Network) Adventure Time (Episode: "Too Young") (Cartoon Network)
 Mad (Episode: "Kitchen Nightmare Before Christmas / How I Met Your Mummy") (Cartoon Network)
 Phineas and Ferb (Episode: "The Doonkleberry Imperative") (Disney Channel)
 Robot Chicken (Episode: "Fight Club Paradise") (Adult Swim)
|-
| style="vertical-align:top;" width="50%" | 
 Wizards of Waverly Place (Disney Channel) Degrassi (TeenNick)
 Good Luck Charlie (Disney Channel)
 iCarly (Nickelodeon)
 Victorious (Nickelodeon)
| style="vertical-align:top;" width="50%" | 
 Sesame Street: Growing Hope Against Hunger (PBS) It Gets Better Project (MTV)
 The Weight of the Nation for Kids: The Great Cafeteria Takeover (HBO)
|-
| style="vertical-align:top;" width="50%" | 
 65th Tony Awards (CBS) 54th Grammy Awards (CBS)
 69th Golden Globe Awards (NBC)
 84th Academy Awards (ABC)
 Herbie Hancock, Gustavo Dudamel, and the Los Angeles Philharmonic Celebrate Gershwin (PBS)
 Live at the Beacon Theater (FX)
| style="vertical-align:top;" width="50%" | 
 Childrens Hospital (Cartoon Network) 30 Rock: The Webisodes (NBC.com)
 The Daily Show Correspondents Explain (thedailyshow.com)
 Parks and Recreation: April and Andy's Road Trip (NBC.com)
 Web Therapy (lstudio.com)
|-
| style="vertical-align:top;" width="50%" | 
 DGA Moments in Time (dga.org) 30 Rock: Ask Tina (NBC.com)
 Bravo's Top Chef: Last Chance Kitchen (bravotv.com)
 Jay Leno's Garage (jaylenosgarage.com)
 Thank a Vet (history.com)
| style="vertical-align:top;" width="50%" | 
 Have You Heard from Johannesburg? (PBS) The Amish (PBS)
 Paradise Lost 3: Purgatory (HBO)
|}

Acting

Art Direction
{| class="wikitable"
|+ 
|-
| style="vertical-align:top;" width="50%" | 
 2 Broke Girls (Episodes: "And the Rich People Problems", "And the Reality Check", "And the Pop Up Sale") (CBS) 30 Rock (Episode: "Live from Studio 6H") (NBC)
 Hell's Kitchen (Episodes: "Episode 915", "Episode 916") (Fox)
 How I Met Your Mother (Episodes: "Now We're Even"; "The Magician's Code: Part I"; "The Magician's Code: Part II") (CBS)
 Mike & Molly (Episodes: "Goin' Fishin'", "Valentine's Piggyback", "The Wedding") (CBS)
| style="vertical-align:top;" width="50%" | 
 Boardwalk Empire (Episodes: "Peg of Old", "Battle of the Century", "To the Lost") (HBO) (TIE) Game of Thrones (Episodes: "Garden of Bones", "The Ghost of Harrenhal", "A Man Without Honor") (HBO) (TIE) Downton Abbey (Episodes: "Episode Four", "Episode Seven") (PBS)
 Justified (Episodes: "Cut Ties", "Loose Ends", "Measures") (FX)
 Mad Men (Episode: "At the Codfish Ball") (AMC)
|-
| style="vertical-align:top;" width="50%" | 
 Great Expectations (PBS) American Horror Story (Episodes: "Pilot", "Open House") (FX)
 Hatfields & McCoys (History)
 Hemingway & Gellhorn (HBO)
 Sherlock ("A Scandal in Belgravia") (PBS)
| style="vertical-align:top;" width="50%" | 
 54th Grammy Awards (CBS) (TIE) 65th Tony Awards (CBS) (TIE) 84th Academy Awards (ABC)
 Saturday Night Live (Episodes: "Host: Jimmy Fallon", "Host: Melissa McCarthy", "Host: Mick Jagger") (NBC)
 The Voice (Episodes: "Blind Auditions: Part II", "Battle Rounds: Part I", "Live Shows: Part IV") (NBC)
|}

Casting
{| class="wikitable"
|+ 
|-
| style="vertical-align:top;" width="50%" | 
 Girls (HBO) The Big C (Showtime)
 Modern Family (ABC)
 New Girl (Fox)
 Nurse Jackie (Showtime)
 Veep (HBO)
| style="vertical-align:top;" width="50%" | 
 Homeland (Showtime) Boardwalk Empire (HBO)
 Downton Abbey (PBS)
 Game of Thrones (HBO)
 The Good Wife (CBS)
 Mad Men (AMC)
|-
| style="vertical-align:top;" width="50%" colspan="2" | 
 Game Change (HBO) American Horror Story (FX)
 Five (Lifetime)
 Hatfields & McCoys (History)
 Sherlock ("A Scandal in Belgravia") (PBS)
|}

Choreography

Cinematography
{| class="wikitable"
|+ 
|-
| style="vertical-align:top;" width="50%" | 
 Two and a Half Men (Episode: "Sips, Sonnets, and Sodomy") (CBS) 2 Broke Girls (Episode: "Pilot") (CBS)
 How I Met Your Mother (Episode: "46 Minutes") (CBS)
 Mike & Molly (Episode: "Victoria Can't Drive") (CBS)
 Pair of Kings (Episode: "The Evil King: Part II") (Disney XD)
| style="vertical-align:top;" width="50%" | 
 Boardwalk Empire (Episode: "21") (HBO) Breaking Bad (Episode: "Face Off") (AMC)
 Glee (Episode: "Asian F") (Fox)
 Mad Men (Episode: "The Phantom") (AMC)
 Pan Am (Episode: "Pilot") (ABC)
|-
| style="vertical-align:top;" width="50%" | 
 Great Expectations (Episode: "Part II") (PBS) Game Change (HBO)
 Hemingway & Gellhorn (HBO)
 Sherlock ("A Scandal in Belgravia") (PBS)
 Treasure Island (Episode: "Part I") (Syfy)
| style="vertical-align:top;" width="50%" | 
 Frozen Planet (Episode: "Ends of the Earth") (Discovery Channel) Anthony Bourdain: No Reservations (Episode: "Mozambique") (Travel Channel)
 George Harrison: Living in the Material World (HBO)
 Prohibition (Episode: "A Nation Of Drunkards") (PBS)
 Whale Wars (Episode: "Race to Save Lives") (Animal Planet)
|-
| style="vertical-align:top;" width="50%" colspan="2" | 
 Deadliest Catch (Episode: "I Don't Wanna Die") (Discovery Channel) The Amazing Race (Episode: "Let Them Drink Their Haterade") (CBS)
 Project Runway (Episode: "The Finale Challenge") (Lifetime)
 Survivor (Episode: "Running the Show") (CBS)
 Top Chef (Episode: "Fit for an Evil Queen") (Bravo)
|}

Commercial

Costuming
{| class="wikitable"
|+ 
|-
| style="vertical-align:top;" width="50%" | 
 Game of Thrones (Episode: "The Prince of Winterfell") (HBO) Boardwalk Empire (Episode: "21") (HBO)
 The Borgias (Episode: "The Confession") (Showtime)
 Downton Abbey (Episode: "Episode One") (PBS)
 Once Upon a Time (Episode: "Hat Trick") (ABC)
| style="vertical-align:top;" width="50%" | 
 Great Expectations (Episode: "Part II") (PBS) American Horror Story (Episode: "Halloween", Part I) (FX)
 Hatfields & McCoys (Episode: "Part I") (History)
 Hemingway & Gellhorn (HBO)
 Sherlock ("A Scandal in Belgravia") (PBS)
 Treasure Island (Episode: "Part I") (Syfy)
|}

Directing

Hairstyling
{| class="wikitable"
|+ 
|-
| style="vertical-align:top;" width="50%" | 
 Downton Abbey (Episode: "Episode One") (PBS) Boardwalk Empire (Episode: "Two Boats and a Lifeguard") (HBO)
 The Borgias (Episode: "The Confession") (Showtime)
 Game of Thrones (Episode: "The Old Gods and the New") (HBO)
 Mad Men (Episode: "The Phantom") (AMC)
| style="vertical-align:top;" width="50%" | 
 Saturday Night Live (Episode: "Host: Zooey Deschanel") (NBC) Dancing with the Stars (Episode: "Episode 1407") (ABC)
 Victorious (Episode: "April Fools Blank") (Nickelodeon)
 The Voice (Episode: "Episode 210A") (NBC)
|-
| style="vertical-align:top;" width="50%" colspan="2" | 
 American Horror Story (FX)'''
 Hatfields & McCoys (History)
 Hemingway & Gellhorn (HBO)
|}

Interactive Media
{| class="wikitable"
|+ 
|-
| style="vertical-align:top;" width="50%" | 
 The Team Coco Sync App (TBS) Bravo's Top Chef: Last Chance Kitchen (bravotv.com)
 Game of Thrones Season Two – Enhanced Digital Experience (HBO)
| style="vertical-align:top;" width="50%" | 
 Dirty Work (rides.tv) Psych HashTag Killer (USA)
 What's Trending With Shira Lazar (whatstrending.com)
|}

Lighting Design / Direction
{| class="wikitable"
|+ 
|-
| style="vertical-align:top;" width="50%" | 
 So You Think You Can Dance (Episode: "Season 8 Finale") (Fox) American Idol (Episode: "Finale") (Fox)
 Dancing with The Stars (Episode: "Episode 1307") (ABC)
 Saturday Night Live (Episode: "Host: Jimmy Fallon") (NBC)
 The Voice (Episode: "Live Shows: Part I") (NBC)
| style="vertical-align:top;" width="50%" | 
 54th Grammy Awards (CBS) 84th Academy Awards (ABC)
 Andrea Bocelli Live In Central Park (PBS)
 Super Bowl XLVI Halftime Show starring Madonna (NBC)
 Victoria's Secret Fashion Show 2011 (CBS)
|}

Main Title Design
{| class="wikitable"
|+ 
|-
| style="vertical-align:top;" | 
 Great Expectations (PBS) American Horror Story (FX)
 Magic City (Starz)
 New Girl (Fox)
 Strike Back (Cinemax)
|}

Make-up
{| class="wikitable"
|+ 
|-
| style="vertical-align:top;" width="50%" | 
 Game of Thrones (Episode: "The Old Gods and the New") (HBO) Boardwalk Empire (Episode: "Georgia Peaches) (HBO)
 Glee (Episode: "Yes/No") (Fox)
 Mad Men (Episode: "Christmas Waltz") (AMC)
 The Middle (Episode: "The Play") (ABC)
| style="vertical-align:top;" width="50%" | 
 Dancing with the Stars (Episode: "Episode 1307") (ABC) Hot in Cleveland (Episode: "Bridezelka) (TV Land)
 How I Met Your Mother (Episode: "Trilogy Time") (CBS)
 Saturday Night Live (Episode: "Host: Katy Perry") (NBC)
 Victorious (Episode: "April Fools Blank") (Nickelodeon)
|-
| style="vertical-align:top;" width="50%" | 
 Hatfields & McCoys (History) American Horror Story (FX)
 Hemingway & Gellhorn (HBO)
| style="vertical-align:top;" width="50%" | 
 The Walking Dead (Episode: "What Lies Ahead") (AMC) American Horror Story (FX)
 Boardwalk Empire (Episode: "The Age of Reason") (HBO)
 Game of Thrones (Episode: "Valar Morghulis") (HBO)
 Once Upon a Time (Episode: "Dreamy") (ABC)
|}

Music
{| class="wikitable"
|+ 
|-
| style="vertical-align:top;" width="50%" | 
 Downton Abbey (Episode: "Episode Six") (PBS) 30 Rock (Episode: "The Tuxedo Begins") (NBC)
 The Borgias (Episode: "The Confession") (Showtime)
 Pan Am (Episode: "Pilot") (ABC)
 Smash (Episode: "Publicity") (NBC)
| style="vertical-align:top;" width="50%" | 
 Hemingway & Gellhorn (HBO) Game Change (HBO)
 Hatfields & McCoys (Episode: "Part I") (History)
 Missing (Episode: "The Hard Drive") (ABC)
 Prep & Landing: Naughty vs. Nice (ABC)
 Sherlock ("A Scandal in Belgravia") (PBS)
|-
| style="vertical-align:top;" width="50%" | 
 The Kennedy Center Honors (CBS) Christmas in Washington (TNT)
 Country Music: In Performance at the White House (PBS)
 Michael Feinstein: The Sinatra Legacy (PBS)
 Seth MacFarlane: Swingin' in Concert (Epix)
 The Thomashefskys: Music and Memories of a Life in the Yiddish Theater (PBS)
| style="vertical-align:top;" width="50%" | 
 65th Tony Awards (Song: "It's Not Just for Gays Anymore") (CBS) The Heart of Christmas (Song: "The Heart of Christmas") (GMC)
 Raising Hope (Episode: "Prodigy", Song: "Welcome Back to Hope") (Fox)
 Saturday Night Live (Episode: "Host: Jason Segel", Song: "I Can't Believe I'm Hosting") (NBC)
 Smash (Episode: "Pilot", Song: "Let Me Be Your Star") (NBC)
|-
| style="vertical-align:top;" width="50%" colspan="2" | 
 Page Eight (PBS) Great Expectations (PBS)
 Hell on Wheels (AMC)
 Homeland (Showtime)
 Touch (Fox)
|}

Picture Editing
{| class="wikitable"
|+ 
|-
| style="vertical-align:top;" width="50%" | 
 Homeland (Episode: "Pilot") (Showtime) Breaking Bad (Episode: "End Times") (AMC)
 Breaking Bad (Episode: "Face Off") (AMC)
 Downton Abbey (Episode: "Episode Seven") (PBS)
 Mad Men (Episode: "Far Away Places") (AMC)
| style="vertical-align:top;" width="50%" | 
 Curb Your Enthusiasm (Episode: "Palestinian Chicken") (HBO) 30 Rock (Episode: "Leap Day") (NBC)
 30 Rock (Episode: "The Tuxedo Begins") (NBC)
 Modern Family (Episode: "Election Day") (ABC)
 Modern Family (Episode: "Leap Day") (ABC)
|-
| style="vertical-align:top;" width="50%" | 
 Hatfields & McCoys (Episode: "Part II") (History) American Horror Story (Episode: "Birth") (FX)
 Game Change (HBO)
 Hemingway & Gellhorn (HBO)
 Sherlock ("A Scandal in Belgravia") (PBS)
| style="vertical-align:top;" width="50%" | 
 How I Met Your Mother (Episode: "Trilogy Time") (CBS) 2 Broke Girls (Episode: "And the Kosher Cupcakes") (CBS)
 The Big Bang Theory (Episode: "The Countdown Reflection") (CBS)
 Hot in Cleveland (Episode: "God and Football") (TV Land)
 Two and a Half Men (Episode: "Why We Gave Up Women") (CBS)
|-
| style="vertical-align:top;" width="50%" | 
 2012 Rock and Roll Hall of Fame Induction Ceremony (HBO) 84th Academy Awards (Opening Film) (ABC)
 The Colbert Report (Episode: "Stephen Colbert Occupies Wall Street") (Comedy Central)
 The Daily Show with Jon Stewart (Episode: "A Love Supreme: Profanity & Nudity on TV") (Comedy Central)
 Extreme Makeover: Home Edition (Rise and Honor: A Veterans Day Special) (ABC)
 Live at the Beacon Theater (FX)
| style="vertical-align:top;" width="50%" | 
 Frozen Planet (Episode: "Ends of the Earth") (Discovery Channel) American Masters ("Johnny Carson: King of Late Night") (PBS)
 Anthony Bourdain: No Reservations (Episode: "U.S. Desert") (Travel Channel)
 Beyond Scared Straight (Episode: "Oakland County, MI") (A&E)
 George Harrison: Living in the Material World (HBO)
|-
| style="vertical-align:top;" width="50%" colspan="2" | 
 Deadliest Catch (Episode: "I Don't Wanna Die") (Discovery Channel) The Amazing Race (Episode: "Let Them Drink Their Haterade") (CBS)
 Project Runway (Episode: "My Pet Project") (Lifetime)
 Survivor (Episode: "Cult-Like") (CBS)
 Top Chef (Episode: Fit for an Evil Queen) (Bravo)
|}

Sound
{| class="wikitable"
|+ 
|-
| style="vertical-align:top;" width="50%" | 
 Game of Thrones (Episode: "Blackwater") (HBO) Boardwalk Empire (Episode: "Gimcrack & Bunkum") (HBO)
 Breaking Bad (Episode: "Face Off") (AMC)
 CSI: Miami (Episode: "Blown Away") (CBS)
 The Walking Dead (Episode: "Beside the Dying Fire") (AMC)
| style="vertical-align:top;" width="50%" | 
 Hemingway & Gellhorn (HBO) American Horror Story (Episode: "Piggy Piggy") (FX)
 Hatfields & McCoys (History)
 The River (Episode: "Doctor Emmet Cole") (ABC)
 Sherlock ("A Scandal in Belgravia") (PBS)
|-
| style="vertical-align:top;" width="50%" | 
 Frozen Planet (Episode: "Ends of the Earth") (Discovery Channel) The Amazing Race (Episode: "Let Them Drink Their Haterade") (CBS)
 George Harrison: Living in the Material World (HBO)
 Paul Simon's Graceland Journey: Under African Skies (A&E)
 Prohibition (Episode: "A Nation Of Hypocrites") (PBS)
| style="vertical-align:top;" width="50%" | 
 Game of Thrones (Episode: "Blackwater") (HBO) Breaking Bad (Episode: "Face Off") (AMC)
 Downton Abbey (Episode: "Episode One") (PBS)
 Homeland (Episode: "Marine One") (Showtime)
 Person of Interest (Episode: "Pilot") (CBS)
|-
| style="vertical-align:top;" width="50%" | 
 Hatfields & McCoys (Episode: "Part I") (History) American Horror Story (Episode: "Piggy Piggy") (FX)
 Game Change (HBO)
 Hemingway & Gellhorn (HBO)
 Sherlock ("A Scandal in Belgravia") (PBS)
| style="vertical-align:top;" width="50%" | 
 Modern Family (Episode: "Dude Ranch") (ABC) 30 Rock (Episode: "Live from Studio 6H") (NBC)
 Entourage (Episode: "The End") (HBO)
 Nurse Jackie (Episode: "Handle Your Scandal") (Showtime)
 Parks and Recreation (Episode: "End of the World") (NBC)
|-
| style="vertical-align:top;" width="50%" | 
 84th Academy Awards (ABC) Lionel Richie and Friends – In Concert (CBS)
 American Idol ("Episode: 1144") (Fox)
 54th Grammy Awards (CBS)
| style="vertical-align:top;" width="50%" | 
 Paul Simon's Graceland Journey: Under African Skies (A&E) The Amazing Race (Episode: "Let Them Drink Their Haterade") (CBS)
 Deadliest Catch (Episode: "I Don't Wanna Die") (Discovery Channel)
 Frozen Planet (Episode: "Ends of the Earth") (Discovery Channel)
 George Harrison: Living in the Material World (HBO)
|}

Special Visual Effects
{| class="wikitable"
|+ 
|-
| style="vertical-align:top;" width="50%" | 
 Game of Thrones (Episode: "Valar Morghulis") (HBO) Falling Skies (Episode: "Live and Learn" / "The Armory) (TNT)
 Inside The Human Body (Episode: "Episode 1") (TLC)
 Once Upon a Time (Episode: "The Stranger") (ABC)
 Pan Am (Episode: "Pilot") (ABC)
 The Walking Dead (Episode: "Beside the Dying Fire") (AMC)
| style="vertical-align:top;" width="50%" | 
 Boardwalk Empire (Episode: "Georgia Peaches") (HBO) Bones (Episode: "The Twist in the Twister") (Fox)
 The Borgias (Episode: "The Choice") (Showtime)
 Breaking Bad (Episode: "Face Off") (AMC)
 Hemingway & Gellhorn (HBO)
 Touch (Episode: "Pilot") (Fox)
|}

Stunt Coordination
{| class="wikitable"
|+ 
|-
| style="vertical-align:top;" | 
 Southland (Episode: "Wednesday") (TNT) American Horror Story (FX)
 Criminal Minds (Episode: "The Bittersweet Science") (CBS)
 Grimm (Episode: "Woman in Black") (NBC)
 Hawaii Five-0 (Episode: "Kame'e: The Hero") (CBS)
 NCIS: Los Angeles (Episode: "Blye, K") (CBS)
|}

Technical Direction
{| class="wikitable"
|+ 
|-
| style="vertical-align:top;" width="50%" | 
 Saturday Night Live (Episode: "Host: Mick Jagger") (NBC) 30 Rock (Episode: "Live from Studio 6H") (NBC)
 The Big Bang Theory (Episode: "The Countdown Reflection") (CBS)
 Dancing with the Stars (Episode: "Episode 1410A") (ABC)
 Late Show with David Letterman (Episode: "Episode 3602") (CBS)
| style="vertical-align:top;" width="50%" | 
 Great Performances: Memphis (PBS)'''
 54th Grammy Awards (CBS)
 84th Academy Awards (ABC)
 The Kennedy Center Honors (CBS)
|}

Writing
{| class="wikitable"
|+ 
|-
| style="vertical-align:top;" width="50%" | 
 'Prohibition: A Nation of Hypocrites (PBS) American Experience (Episode: "Clinton") (PBS)
 American Masters (PBS)
 Anthony Bourdain: No Reservations (Travel Channel)
 Sesame Street: Growing Hope Against Hunger (PBS)
| style="vertical-align:top;" width="50%" | 
 The Daily Show with Jon Stewart (Comedy Central)' The Colbert Report (Comedy Central)
 Portlandia (IFC)
 Real Time with Bill Maher (HBO)
 Saturday Night Live (NBC)
|}

Programs with multiple awards
By network 
 HBO – 17
 CBS – 13
 PBS – 11
 Discovery Channel – 6
 NBC – 5
 ABC / Cartoon Network – 4
 History – 3
 Comedy Central / Disney Channel / Fox / FX / Showtime - 2 
 By program
 Game of Thrones – 6
 Frozen Planet / Great Expectations / Saturday Night Live – 4
 65th Tony Awards / Boardwalk Empire / Hatfields & McCoys – 3
 Deadliest Catch / Downton Abbey / George Harrison: Living in the Material World / Hemingway & Gellhorn / Homeland / Secret Mountain Fort Awesome / 54th Grammy Awards / The Kennedy Center Honors / Two and a Half Men'' - 2

Note

Presenters

 Morena Baccarin
 Thom Beers
 Dane Boedigheimer
 Shane Brennan
 Dan Bucatinsky
 David Carbonara
 Frances Conroy
 Emily Deschanel
 Kenneth Ehrlich
 Johnny Galecki
 Greg Garcia
 Billy Gardell
 Mark Gardner
 Vince Gilligan
 Howard Gordon
 Kathy Griffin
 Sig Hansen
 Hart Hanson
 Neil Patrick Harris
 Christina Hendricks
 Adam Horowitz
 Tom Kenny
 Edward Kitsis
 Jim Kouf
 Lisa Kudrow
 LL Cool J
 Padma Lakshmi
 Nigel Lythgoe
 Mark Margolis
 Jennifer Morrison
 Mary Murphy
 Ryan Murphy
 David Neal
 Chris O'Donnell
 Martha Plimpton
 Bill Prady
 Mark Roberts
 Matthew Weiner
 Silas Weir Mitchell

Source:

References

External links
 Academy of Television Arts and Sciences website

064 Creative Arts
Creative Arts, 64th
2012 in American television
Primetime Creative
2012 awards in the United States
September 2012 events in the United States